Luke Snellin (born 9 March 1986) is an English screenwriter and director working in film, television, music videos and commercials. According to Idol Magazine,  he is known for his distinctive use of cinematography and music as well as often employing light hearted themes, romance and nostalgia.

He has been featured as a new director in Shots, called "Markedly Talented" by The Telegraph, and nominated by Jonas Mekas for V magazine. He was named as one of Screen International "Stars of Tomorrow" in 2010. and one of Broadcast "Hot Shots" in 2013.

Short films
His 2009 short film Mixtape (2 mins) starring Bill Milner was nominated for a BAFTA for Best Short Film and won the Virgin Media Shorts competition. The film features music from The Kinks and Heart.

Jason Solomons singled out the film in his Trailer Trash column for The Guardian in the build up to the BAFTA Awards in 2010. He stated that he was "Immediately charmed by its retro story of a boy who makes a cassette of songs for the girl next door".

In honour of Mixtape's BAFTA nomination, BBC 6 Music presenter Lauren Laverne invited Snellin on her show to share a mixtape from when he was 11 years old in the memory tapes segment.

Snellin's 2010 follow up, Disco (15 mins), once again starring Milner and featuring a soundtrack from Britpop bands Cast and Suede, played at several Oscar qualifying film festivals and was long listed for a BAFTA for Best Short Film.

He has since directed several other short films including the first ever Old Vic 24-hour short film JESS//JIM (6 mins) starring Toby Kebbell which was conceived, written, shot, edited and finished in 24 hours. He also wrote and directed Charlie (2 mins), a short film made to commemorate the anniversary of Charlie Chaplin's birth.

Music videos

He has directed music videos for notable artists such as Get Cape. Wear Cape. Fly, Emmy The Great & Tim Wheeler, Young Rebel Set and Australian Music Prize Winners Cloud Control, the latter starring British actors Alexander Arnold and Sam Palladio.

His video for Emmy The Great and Tim Wheeler's Christmas single 'Home for the Holidays' was called a "Richard Curtis style pub-bound love fest" by the Telegraph.

Television

He was selected as one of seven directors, from nearly a thousand applicants, to direct an episode of original drama for Channel 4 through the broadcaster's "Coming Up" scheme. This led to him directing episodes of BAFTA and Emmy-nominated My Mad Fat Diary, Russell T Davies' Banana, Pete Bowker's The A Word and lead directing the BBC/Netflix coproduction Wanderlust, written by Nick Payne and starring Toni Collette. He was also the lead director on Temple, written by Mark O'Rowe and starring Mark Strong for Sky.

Feature films

Snellin directed the feature film adaptation of John Green, Lauren Myracle and Maureen Johnson's young adult novel, Let It Snow, released by Netflix on 8 November 2019.

Awards
 Won – Virgin Media Shorts 2009 Grand Prize for Mixtape
 Nominated – BAFTA Short Film Award for Mixtape
 Nominated – Best Newcomer Rushes Soho Shorts for Patrick
 Nominated – British Airways Great Britons 2011
 Won – Purbeck Film Festival Best Film for Mixtape
 Won – Landcrab Film Festival Best Film for Mixtape
 Won – LA New Wave IFF Best Screenplay for Disco
 Longlisted – BAFTA Short Film Award for Disco
 Won – NFFTY Seattle Best International Film for Patrick
 Won – Current TV/VCAM – Sony PS3 Ad competition

Filmography
Short films

 Patrick (2008)
 Mixtape (2009)
 Disco (2010)
 Charlie (2011)
 JESS//JIM (2011)
 FIRST (2016)

Television
 Sink or Swim (Coming Up)
 My Mad Fat Diary – Series 2 Episode 3 – Girls
 My Mad Fat Diary – Series 2 Episode 4 – Friday
 The Job Lot – Series 2
 Banana
 The A Word
 Wanderlust
 Temple

Feature films
 Let It Snow (2019) 

Music videos
 Get Cape. Wear Cape. Fly - Collapsing Cities Feat. Shy FX
 Young Rebel Set - Red Bricks
 Cloud Control - Death Cloud
 Emmy The Great & Tim Wheeler - Home for the Holidays
 Get Cape. Wear Cape. Fly - The Real McCoy
 Emmy The Great & Tim Wheeler - Zombie Christmas
 Summer Camp - Bad Love

References

External links 
 

1986 births
Living people
English screenwriters
English male screenwriters
English film directors